Sivani (also known as Sivani Panchayath) is a village in Chhapara Tehsil in Seoni District of Madhya Pradesh State, India. It belongs to Jabalpur Division. It is located 40 km to the north of District headquarters Seoni. 278 km from State capital Bhopal

Sivani is surrounded by Lakhnadon Tehsil towards the North, Dhanaura Tehsil towards the East, Seoni Tehsil towards the South, and Keolari Tehsil towards the East.

Cities near Sivani include Seoni, Nainpur, Chhindwara, and Wara Seoni..

Demographics of Sivani
The local language of Sivani is Hindi.

Transport links

Rail
There is no railway station closer than 1000 km to Sivani. However, Jabalpur Railway Station is a major railway station 187 km away.

Pincodes near Sivani
480884 (Chhapara), 480886 (Lakhnadon), 480887 (Adegaon)

Jungle Book
The story of Jungle Book happens in Seoni jungle.

Colleges near Sivani
Govt. Art And Commerce College, Keolari
Address : Keolari-ugli Road, keolari
Gwlior Institute Of Technology And Science
Address : Kedarpur; Shivpuri Link Rd; Lashkar; Gwalior

Schools near Sivani
Up Gms Kondra
Address : kondra, chhapara, seoni, Madhya Pradesh. PIN- 480884, Post - Chhapara
Up Gms Danimeta
Address : danimeta, chhapara, seoni, Madhya Pradesh. PIN- 480884, Post - Chhapara
Up Gms Kareli
Address : kareli, chhapara, seoni, Madhya Pradesh. PIN- 480885
Up Gms Bakshi
Address : bakshi, chhapara, seoni, Madhya Pradesh. PIN- 480887, Post - Adegaon

References

Villages in Seoni district